Microphysogobio wulonghensis is a species of cyprinid fish endemic to the Wulonghe River in Shandong Province, China.

References

Cyprinid fish of Asia
Fish described in 2011
Microphysogobio